Flambeaux is a fire performer who made it to the Top 40 on NBC's hit series America's Got Talent season 3. His audition performance was featured on-air, although his second show in Las Vegas only had a few clips aired on the show. He made it to the third round in Los Angeles where he was voted off the show.

He has been performing fire in New York City since 1991 in shows such as Le Scandal and Simon Hammerstein's The Box.

Flambeaux became an underground icon in downtown New York City through his performance troupe dubbed "The P-Cult". The P-Cult formed in 1999 and disbanded in 2007 around the time Flambeaux joined the cast of "The Box."

He first learned fire through his time spent around the circus Archaos in London from 1988 to 1989.

He and his wife are fire partners and business partners. They have performed together in productions such as Top Talent USA at Turning Stone Resort & Casino.

References

American stunt performers
America's Got Talent contestants
Living people
Year of birth missing (living people)